La Turballe is a commune in the Loire-Atlantique department in western France. This commune is known for its harbor, which is the first fishing harbor in the region. Every summer, there is a sardine party (fête de la sardine in French).

La Turballe is close to the La Baule seaside resort.

The town, located on the Côte d'Amour, has 11 kilometers of beaches.

See also
La Baule - Guérande Peninsula
Communes of the Loire-Atlantique department

References

Communes of Loire-Atlantique
Port cities and towns on the French Atlantic coast